Vempati Chinna Satyam (15 October 1929 – 29 July 2012) was an Indian dancer and a guru of the Kuchipudi dance form.

Chinna Satyam was born in a brahmin family at Kuchipudi, Andhra Pradesh. He was taught by Vedantam Lakshmi Narayana Sastry. He then refined his art by learning from Sri Tadepally Perrayya Sastry and later was trained by his elder brother Sri Vempati Pedda Satyam in expressions. As he learnt the nuances of this style of dance, he was successful in propagating the Kuchipudi dance form all over the world. He died of old age related problems at the age of 83 on 29 July 2012.

Dance
Chinna Satyam sublimated and systematised Indian Kuchipudi dance, giving it a more classical basis. He refined the art form, bringing it closer to the standards of Natya Shastra and gave it a whole new perspective and introduced new elements, e.g. chari (leg movements) of Natya Shastra that are significantly different from the interpretations of other dance authorities, such as Padma Subrahmanyam. Previously, it had been considered a "rustic" (folk) form of dance.

Kuchipudi Art Academy

Chinna Satyam started the Kuchipudi Art Academy at Madras in 1963. The Academy has to its credit more than 180 solo items and 15 dance dramas composed and choreographed by Satyam. These solo items and dramas have been staged all over India and abroad. He composed his first dance drama Sri Krishna Parijatham in the same period followed by another hit Ksheera Sagara Madanam and played the lead role. His portrayal of Lord Shiva and his choreography was well received.

Awards and honours

Vempati Chinna Satyam was conferred with many titles and awards such as "Sangeet Peeth of Bombay", "Asthana Natyacharya of Tirumala Tirupati Devasthanam", T.T.K. Memorial Award by Madras Music Academy, "Natya Kalasaagara of Waltair", "Raja-Lakshmi Award  of Madras", "Kalaprapoorna" from Andhra University, "Natya Kala Bhushana of Guntur", "Bharatha Kalaprapoorna of Hyderabad", D. Litt. from Sri Venkateswara University, "Asthana Natyacharya of Pittsburgh", and "National Award from Central Sangeet Naatak Akademi, New Delhi". He was awarded by many state governments of India such as Kalidas Puraskar by the Government of Madhya Pradesh and Kalaimamani by the Government of Tamil Nadu. He was honored with a Doctorate degree by Andhra University. He was also awarded the Padma Bhushan by the Government of India.

References

Indian male dancers
1929 births
2012 deaths
Kuchipudi exponents
Recipients of the Sangeet Natak Akademi Fellowship
Recipients of the Padma Bhushan in arts
People from Krishna district
Dancers from Andhra Pradesh
20th-century Indian dancers
Educators from Karnataka
Indian dance teachers
Recipients of the Sangeet Natak Akademi Award